The following is a list of Singaporean electoral divisions from 1997 to 2001 that served as constituencies that elected Members of Parliament (MPs) to the 9th Parliament of Singapore in the 1997 Singaporean general elections. The total number of seats in Parliament had increased by 2 to 83 since the last general election.

The number of members in a team representing a group representative constituency (GRC) was increased from 4 to 6. This reduced the total number of electoral divisions to 24.

Group Representation Constituencies

Single Member Constituencies

References

External links 
 

1997